RU-58642 is a nonsteroidal antiandrogen (NSAA) derived from nilutamide with very high affinity and selectivity for the androgen receptor (AR), which made it among the most potent and efficacious antiandrogens known at the time of its discovery. It was investigated for topical application for the treatment of androgenetic alopecia (male-pattern baldness), but development did not proceed past initial trial stages, and it is now only used for scientific research into the AR.

See also
 Cyanonilutamide
 RU-56187
 RU-57073
 RU-58841
 RU-59063

References

Abandoned drugs
Hydantoins
Nitriles
Nonsteroidal antiandrogens
Trifluoromethyl compounds